Shirdi Ke Sai Baba is a 1977 Bollywood film directed by Ashok V. Bhushan. The plot revolves around a sick child who wishes to be taken to Shirdi, where the guru Sai Baba of Shirdi lived.

Cast

Sudhir Dalvi as Sai Baba of Shirdi
Manoj Kumar as  Devotee & Scientist
Rajendra Kumar as Doctor (Pooja's husband) 
Hema Malini as Pooja 
Shatrughan Sinha as Heera 
Krishan Dhawan as Chaand
Raj Mehra as Murthy 
Birbal as Kulkarni 
B. M. Vyas as Vaid
Usha Chavan as Laxmi 
C.S. Dubey as Groom's dad 
Manmohan Krishna as  Ganpat Rao 
Dheeraj Kumar as Tatya (Baijamma's son) 
Prem Nath as Som Dev 
Kanwarjit Paintal as Karim 
Madan Puri as Ranbir Singh 
Ratnamala as Baijamma 
Sachin as Sarju 
Gurbachan Singh as Bandit who come to kill Sai Baba of Shirdi
Shrikant Moghe as Gokhale

Music
"Sai Baba Bolo, Sai Baba Bolo" - Mohammed Rafi, Jani Babu, Anuradha Paudwal, Anup Jalota
"Bhola Bhandari Sai, Bhola Bhandari" - Anup Jalota, Dilraj Kaur
"Sumer Manwa Sumer Re Panch" - Anup Jalota
"Tuhi Faqir, Tuhi Hai Raja, Tuhi Hai Sai, Tuhi Hai Baba" - Mohammed Rafi, Usha Mangeshkar
"Dam Dam Damroo Baaje, Are Sai Nath Shiv Shambhu Wale" - Anup Jalota
"O Dukhiyo Ke Data" - Asha Bhosle
"Dar Bhi Chhoda Tujhe Mann Me Basa Ke" - Asha Bhosle
"Dipaawali Manaai Suhaani" - Asha Bhosle

External links
 

1977 films
1970s Hindi-language films
Sai Baba of Shirdi
Indian historical films
1970s historical films